The PFL 2 mixed martial arts event for the 2019 season of the Professional Fighters League was held on May 23, 2019, at the Nassau Coliseum in Uniondale, New York. This was the second regular season event of 2019 and included fights in the featherweight and lightweight divisions.

Background

At the weigh-ins, Alexandre Bezerra and Alexandre de Almeida both missed weight for their featherweight bouts. As a result, both fighters were pulled from the card and their respective opponents - Jeremy Kennedy and Luis Rafael Laurentino - faced each other on the preliminary card.

Ramsey Nijem was expected to face Ronys Torres at this event. However, Torres failed his medical tests prior to the weigh-ins and the bout was cancelled. Nijem was awarded three points toward a potential playoff spot.

Results

Standings After Event
The point system consists of outcome based scoring and bonuses for an early win. Under the outcome based scoring system, the winner of a fight receives 3 points and the loser receives 0 points. If the fight ends in a draw, both fighters will receive 1 point. The bonus for winning a fight in the first, second, or third round is 3 points, 2 points, and 1 point respectively. For example, if a fighter wins a fight in the first round, then the fighter will receive 6 total points. If a fighter misses weight, then the fighter that missed weight will receive 0 points and his opponent will receive 3 points due to a walkover victory.

Featherweight

Lightweight

See also
List of PFL events
List of current PFL fighters

References

Professional Fighters League
2019 in mixed martial arts
Mixed martial arts in New York (state)
Sports in Long Island
2019 in sports in New York (state)
May 2019 sports events in the United States
Events on Long Island
Events in Uniondale, New York